All Saints Street, alternately known as All Saints Street: 1031 and 1031 All Saints Street, is a Chinese webcomic written and illustrated by the artist Lingzi. The slice of life series follows a group of mythological beings who share an apartment in modern China. All Saints Street has been published on Bilibili since 2016, and was adapted into a donghua web series by Tencent Video. The first two seasons were released in 2020 with a third in 2022, and a fourth season set to air in 2023. The donghua was internationally released by Crunchyroll in November 2022 with a Japanese-language dub.

Synopsis
The series is set in a fictionalized version of Earth where humans, deities, and demons co-exist peacefully. Neil "Nini" Bowman, a demon who is fascinated by humans, runs away from home to live in the human world. Despite his desire to integrate himself with humans, he ultimately finds himself sharing an apartment with other mythological beings.

Characters
Neil "Nini" Bowman 
Voiced by: Haiquing Xia (Chinese), Daiki Yamashita (Japanese)
A demon who moves from Hell to live in the human world.

Ira Blood
Voiced by: Xin Teng (Chinese), Jun Fukuyama (Japanese)
Neil's roommate. A vampire from an aristocratic family who ran away from home, and now lives as an unkempt slacker.

Lynn Angel
Voiced by: Xianghai Hao (Chinese), Kaito Ishikawa (Japanese) 
Neil's landlord. An angel with a stern but kind demeanor.

Vladimir Elliot Kirilenko
Voiced by: Yanzhe Du (Chinese), Tomoaki Maeno (Japanese)
A werewolf who becomes Neil's roommate after being sent by the World Werewolf Association to monitor him. Because of his long name, he is nicknamed Damao ( "long hair") by his roommates.

Abu
Voiced by: Xianghai Hao (seasons 1-2), Peng Sun (season 3) (Chinese), Shun Horie (Japanese)
Neil's roommate. A mummy who never speaks, and is typically only seen in the background.

Lily Angel
Voiced by: Yanyan Xi (Chinese), Marika Kono (Japanese)
Lynn's younger sister, whom Neil develops a crush on.

Nick Hoult
Voiced by: Zhang Zhen (Chinese), Yuichi Nakamura (Japanese)
Neil's older half-brother.

Evan Angel
Voiced by: Yang Xinran (Chinese), Kensho Ono (Japanese)
Lily's close friend, whom Neil is jealous of.

Luis Bite
Voiced by: Hu Lian (Chinese), Ryōhei Kimura (Japanese) 
Neil's roommate. An American zombie and aspiring actor.

Momo
Voiced by: Hei Te (Chinese), Miyuki Sawashiro (Japanese)
An alcoholic Nekomata and former J-pop idol who lives next door.

Crystal
Momo and Nick's friend. A Swedish unicorn now working as an exorcist.

Episodes

Series overview

Season 1 (2020)

Season 2 (2020)

Season 3 (2022)

Media
All Saints Street was originally published as a webcomic on the video sharing website Bilibili, where it has been serialized since 2016. In 2020, the series was adapted into an animated web series produced by Tencent Video and FENZ animation (Numerator), and animated by Hanmu Chunhua (HMCH). Season 1 aired from April to May 2020, and Season 2 aired October to December of the same year. Season 3 aired from January to April 2022, and a Season 4 was announced in December 2022 with a release date of 2023. 

A Japanese-language dubbed version of the series was announced in March 2022  and premiered November 13, 2022. The main cast was announced in July 2022. In addition, the Japanese release included a Japanese version of the opening theme performed by CeVIO AI, and an original ending theme titled "mawari mawaru" (まわりまわる) performed by Sasanomaly. It is being simulcast on Crunchyroll, and distributed by Aniplex of America in the United States. The series will receive a DVD and Blu-ray release from February to April 2023.

Reception
, the series has exceeded 200 million views on Tencent Video.

Notes 
a.All English titles are taken from Crunchyroll.

References

External links
All Saints Street (comic) at Bilibili
All Saints Street (cartoon) at Tencent Video
All Saints Street (cartoon) at Crunchyroll
Official donghua website (in Japanese)
Official donghua website (in English)

2016 webcomic debuts
Short form webcomics
2020 web series debuts
2020 Chinese television series debuts
Anime-influenced animation
Chinese webcomics
Chinese web series
Tencent original programming
Chinese animated television series
Television shows based on webcomics